"Cozy Little Christmas" is a Christmas song by American singer Katy Perry. It was released exclusively on Amazon Music on November 15, 2018, and later distributed to all platforms on November 1, 2019. She wrote and produced the song with Greg Wells and Ferras Alqaisi.

"Cozy Little Christmas" was written about Perry's time spent with her family in Copenhagen for Christmas. The track's lyrics discuss prioritizing love and affection over gifts. It charted at number 10 in Croatia, number 22 in the United Kingdom and Belgium, and number 53 in the United States. The song also reached number one on the Billboard Adult Contemporary chart. A music video was released on December 2, 2019. The track has been certified platinum by Recording Industry Association of America (RIAA).

Music and composition
Katy Perry announced the song on Twitter, posting a four-second audio clip of it on November 14, 2018, with the caption that she was "Bout to sleigh in an hour". It is her second Christmas song after "Every Day Is a Holiday", which was released in 2015. Perry co-wrote and co-produced "Cozy Little Christmas" with Greg Wells and Ferras Alqaisi. She called it "one of my favorite songs I've written".

Perry wrote the song about spending Christmas in Copenhagen with her family. "Cozy Little Christmas" runs for 3 minutes and 2 seconds. It is a "whimsical" Christmas song featuring jingle bells and lyrics about not needing gifts at Christmas time because love is more important. Perry sings "I don't need diamonds or sparkly things" and "you can't buy this feeling" along with "Nothing lights my fire or wraps me up baby like you do" in the chorus.

Release
"Cozy Little Christmas" was released exclusively on Amazon Music on November 15, 2018, before becoming available on all platforms on November 1, 2019, and having a vinyl distribution on October 22, 2021.

Music video
The song's music video was released on December 2, 2019. It opens with Perry decorating a Christmas tree in a festive living room before Santa Claus and animated characters from Rudolph the Red-Nosed Reindeer appear. Perry and Santa, who is dressed in a striped bathing suit and Hawaiian shirt, then have a pampered Christmas, relaxing at a poolside and getting massages while the animated characters wait on them. Perry later appears dressed as a candy cane in a giant martini glass full of eggnog. While drunk on eggnog, she talks to the animated characters in a kitchen, and the video ends with all the characters dancing in the festive living room intercut with martini glass and kitchen scenes.

Critical reception
Idolator's Mike Wass called it "cute, catchy and utterly adorable", and observed that "the perky bop is every bit as irreverent and fun as you would expect". Marina Pedrosa from Billboard said that "Perry's vocals are velvety as ever as she sings the festive lyrics, 'Just you and me / Under the tree / A cozy little Christmas here with you.'"

Zac Gelfand of Consequence of Sound wrote that "Cozy Little Christmas" is an "appropriate step back and a deep breath" for Perry and "a simple, bubbly, holiday love song, serving as a respite after an otherwise tough several months." Writing for MTV News, Madeline Roth praised the "bubbly bop" as "mighty cozy", adding that "this festive little tune will be a crowd-pleaser all around".

The song was ranked at number 79 on  Billboard'''s Greatest of All Time Holiday 100 Songs.

Chart performance
In the United States, "Cozy Little Christmas" entered the Billboard Adult Contemporary chart at number 10, becoming Perry's ninth track to reach its top 10 and first to do so since "Dark Horse" in 2014.
It has since reached number one on that chart as well as number 53 on the Billboard Hot 100 and number 30 on its Holiday 100 chart. On January 27, 2022, the song was certified platinum by the Recording Industry Association of America for 1,000,000 units.

Within Europe, the song debuted at number 85 on the UK Singles Chart, rising to number 22 in the nation the following year. "Cozy Little Christmas" has also been certified Silver by the British Phonographic Industry (BPI) for shipments of 200,000 units. It has reached the same peak in Belgium while charting at numbers 10 in Croatia, 38 in Germany, 37 in Austria, and 57 in Switzerland.

Live performances and use in media

Perry performed the song for the first time on December 6, 2019, as part of her set list for the 2019 iHeartRadio Jingle Ball Tour. The performance of the song on December 6, 2019, was broadcast during The CW special on December 19, 2019. On November 30, 2020, she performed the song along with "I'll Be Home for Christmas" at The Disney Holiday Singalong.

The song was used in the 2020 Christmas-themed television film The Christmas House and 2021 Netflix Christmas romantic comedy film The Princess Switch 3: Romancing the Star.

Credits and personnel
Credits adapted from Tidal and Rolling Stone India''.

 Katy Perry – lead vocals, production, background vocals, songwriting
 Ferras Alqaisi – background vocals, production, songwriting
 Greg Wells – production, songwriting, mixing, bass guitar, celesta, drums, harp, piano
 Al Schmitt – record engineering
 Ian MacGregor – record engineering
 Brian Lucey – mastering engineering

Charts

Weekly charts

Year-end charts

Certifications

Release history

See also
 List of Billboard Adult Contemporary number ones of 2018

References

2018 singles
2018 songs
American Christmas songs
Katy Perry songs
Capitol Records singles
Song recordings produced by Greg Wells
Songs written by Ferras
Songs written by Greg Wells
Songs written by Katy Perry